Clinkard is a surname. Notable people with the surname include:

Archibald Clinkard (died 1696), member of the Parliament of England
Cecil Clinkard (1862–1941), member of the Parliament of New Zealand
George William Clinkard (1893–1970), New Zealand public servant and trade commissioner